Glenn Williams is an American sound engineer. He was nominated for an Academy Award in the category Best Sound for the film Backdraft.

Selected filmography
 Backdraft (1991)

References

External links

Year of birth missing (living people)
Living people
American audio engineers